HaOgen (lit. anchor) is a kibbutz in central Israel. Located in the Sharon plain, it falls under the jurisdiction of Emek Hefer Regional Council and is affiliated with Hashomer Hatzair.

History
The community was established on 22 April 1939 by Jewish refugees from Czechoslovakia. After spending eight years in a camp near Kfar Saba, they founded the kibbutz on 28 August 1947, on land that had belonged to Wadi Qabbani. The Jewish National Fund provided 700 dunams of land for the kibbutz.

Notable people
Haya Kaspi
Shraga Weil

References

Czechoslovak Jews
Kibbutzim
Kibbutz Movement
Populated places established in 1947
1947 establishments in Mandatory Palestine
Populated places in Central District (Israel)
Czech-Jewish culture in Israel
Slovak-Jewish culture in Israel